Altoviti may refer to:

 Altoviti,  prominent noble family of Florence, Italy
 Bindo Altoviti (1491 - 1557), banker and patron of the arts
 Portrait of Bindo Altoviti, painting by Raphael commissioned by Bindo Altoviti 
 Madonna dell'Impanata, painting by Raphael commissioned by Bindo Altoviti 
 Antonio Altoviti (1521 - 1573), Archbishop of Florence  
 Giacomo Altoviti (1604 - 1693), Patriarch of Antiochia and Archbishop of Athenae  
 Banking families